54th Brigade may refer to:

 54th Indian Brigade of the British Indian Army in the First World War
 54th Anti-Aircraft Brigade (United Kingdom)
 54th Brigade (United Kingdom)
 54th Mechanized Brigade (Ukraine)

See also
 54th Division (disambiguation)